Øystein Neerland (born 4 February 1964) is a former Norwegian football forward, best known for his time in Molde.

Career
He came to Molde from Skåla in 1987. In the last match of the season on 10 October 1987 against Moss, Jostein Flo and Neerland had several opportunities to score the decisive goal and make Molde win the league, but Moss won the match 2-0 which made Moss champions while Molde had to settle with silver.

Neerland scored one goal when Molde and Viking met in the final of 1989 Norwegian Cup. The final ended 2-2, and it took a replay to decide a winner which Viking won 2–1. Neerland was Molde's top goalscorer with 11 goals in 1991, and when his career in Molde ended in 1993 he had scored 34 goals in 120 matches.

Career statistics 
Source:

References

External links
 Øystein Neerland profile at n3sport.no

1964 births
Living people
Norwegian footballers
Eliteserien players
Association football forwards
Molde FK players
Molde FK directors and chairmen